George Green is a hamlet in the parish of Wexham, in the Buckinghamshire district of the ceremonial county of Buckinghamshire, England. It is situated between Slough and Iver Heath, close to the boundary of the borough of Slough.

The hamlet is named after King George I. Close by are Langley and Black Park. The George, a notable pub, is located here.

Hamlets in Buckinghamshire